State Road 562 (NM 562) is a  state highway in the US state of New Mexico. NM 562's western terminus is at the end of state maintenance in Clapham, and the eastern terminus is at NM 402 south of Clayton.

Major intersections

See also

References

562
Transportation in Union County, New Mexico